The 1909 Pittsburgh Pirates season was the 28th season for the Pittsburgh Pirates franchise, during which they won the National League pennant with a record of 110–42 and their first World Series over the Detroit Tigers. Led by shortstop Honus Wagner and outfielder-manager Fred Clarke, the Pirates scored the most runs in the majors. Wagner led the league in batting average, on-base percentage, slugging percentage, and runs batted in. Pirates owner Barney Dreyfuss opened the Pirates' new ballpark, named Forbes Field, on June 30, 1909.

The Pirates' 110 wins remain a team record, a record they set in the last game of the season by beating the Cincinnati Reds 7–4 in muddy conditions on October 5. It is in fact the best regular season win percentage by any World Series winning team.

Regular season

Season standings

Record vs. opponents

Notable transactions
 May 28, 1909: Ward Miller and cash were traded by the Pirates to the Cincinnati Reds for Blaine Durbin.

Roster

Player stats

Batting

Starters by position
Note: Pos = Position; G = Games played; AB = At bats; H = Hits; Avg. = Batting average; HR = Home runs; RBI = Runs batted in

Other batters
Note: G = Games played; AB = At bats; H = Hits; Avg. = Batting average; HR = Home runs; RBI = Runs batted in

Pitching

Starting pitchers
Note: G = Games pitched; IP = Innings pitched; W = Wins; L = Losses; ERA = Earned run average; SO = Strikeouts

Other pitchers
Note: G = Games pitched; IP = Innings pitched; W = Wins; L = Losses; ERA = Earned run average; SO = Strikeouts

Relief pitchers
Note: G = Games pitched; W = Wins; L = Losses; SV = Saves; ERA = Earned run average; SO = Strikeouts

Awards and honors

League top five finishers
Howie Camnitz
 #2 in NL in wins (25)
 #4 in NL in ERA (1.62)

Fred Clarke
 #2 in NL in runs scored (97)
 #4 in NL in on-base percentage (.384)

Tommy Leach
 MLB leader in runs scored (126)

Dots Miller
 #3 in NL in RBI (87)

Honus Wagner
 NL leader in batting average (.339)
 NL leader in RBI (100)
 NL leader in on-base percentage (.420)
 NL leader in slugging percentage (.489)
 #3 in NL in runs scored (92)

Vic Willis
 #4 in NL in wins (22)

1909 World Series

In the World Series, Pittsburgh faced the American League champion Detroit Tigers, led by triple crown winner Ty Cobb. The matchup was largely billed as one between the major leagues' two superstars. Wagner thoroughly outplayed Cobb, and rookie Babe Adams won all three of his starts, as the Pirates won in seven games.

Game 1
October 8, 1909, at Forbes Field in Pittsburgh, Pennsylvania

Game 2
October 9, 1909, at Forbes Field in Pittsburgh, Pennsylvania

Game 3
October 11, 1909, at Bennett Park in Detroit, Michigan

Game 4
October 12, 1909, at Bennett Park in Detroit, Michigan

Game 5
October 13, 1909, at Forbes Field in Pittsburgh, Pennsylvania

Game 6
October 14, 1909, at Bennett Park in Detroit, Michigan

Game 7
October 16, 1909, at Bennett Park in Detroit, Michigan

Notes

References

External links
 1909 Pittsburgh Pirates team page at Baseball Reference
 1909 Pittsburgh Pirates Page at Baseball Almanac

Pittsburgh Pirates seasons
National League champion seasons
World Series champion seasons
Pittsburgh Pirates season
Pittsburg Pir